The American Sugar Refining Company (ASR) was the largest American business unit in the sugar refining industry in the early 1900s. It had interests in Puerto Rico and other Caribbean locations, and operated one of the world's largest sugar refineries, the Domino Sugar Refinery in Brooklyn, New York.

The Domino brand name was acquired in 2001 by Florida Crystals Corporation and rebranded as American Sugar Refining, a new company created in 1998 and unrelated to the prior firm by that name.

History

Establishment
The Sugar Refineries Company or Sugar Trust was incorporated in late 1887, with Henry Osborne Havemeyer as president. Sugar Trust was forced to reorganize after the Sherman Antitrust Act of 1890 outlawed trusts that formed monopolies, such as the Sugar Trust. The ASR was incorporated in the state of New Jersey on January 10, 1891 by Henry Osborne Havemeyer, with $50 million in capital. By 1907, it owned or controlled 98% of the sugar processing capacity in the United States.

The United States Supreme Court declared in United States v. E. C. Knight Company that its purchase of the stock of competitors was not a combination in restraint of trade. By 1901, the company had $90 million in capital. The company became known as Domino Sugar in 1900.

Expansion
The combination expanded horizontally for about twenty years as new competitors arose; later it expanded vertically, undertaking the production of cane sugar and raw sugar in Cuba and acquiring lumber interests. In May 1896, American Sugar Refining Company became one of the original 12 companies in the Dow Jones Industrial Average. The company was investigated by the Industrial Commission in 1900 and by a special congressional committee in 1911–1912.

In 1910 the federal government began a suit for the company's dissolution.

American Sugar Refining Company continued to dominate the sugar industry in the United States through most of the 20th Century. Its brands included the dominant Domino Sugar, Franklin Sugar, Sunny Cane Sugar, and its West Coast beet sugar operation under the Spreckels brand. It had major refineries in Brooklyn; Charlestown, Massachusetts; Philadelphia, Baltimore, Chalmette, Louisiana; and Spreckels, California.

Name change
In the early 1970s, the company made major investments in high-fructose corn syrup production, and changed its name to Amstar Corporation (ASR). It moved its headquarters from 120 Wall Street to 1251 Avenue of the Americas in Midtown Manhattan.

In 1975, Amstar sued pizza chain Domino's Pizza for trademark infringement; Amstar won at trial but lost on appeal.

With investments in food-picking and handling machinery companies in the Midwestern United States, the company faced a takeover by the British sugar company Tate & Lyle in 1980. How long this lasted is uncertain.

Amstar was acquired by Kohlberg Kravis Roberts in 1983; KKR sold Amstar to Merrill Lynch three years later.

Domino Sugar was acquired by British company Tate & Lyle in 1988.

Takeover
In 2001, Domino Sugar officially changed its name to Domino Foods, Inc. The same year, Domino  Domino Foods was sold by Tate & Lyle to American Sugar Refining, a new company created in 1998 and unrelated to the prior firm by that name, and the Sugar Cane Growers Cooperative of Florida in a $180 million deal that was closed on November 6, 2001.

Privately held American Sugar Refining is owned by the Florida Crystals Corporation  company, part of FLO-SUN, a sugar empire of the Fanjul Brothers whose origins trace to Spanish-Cuban sugar plantations of the early 19th century.  American Sugar Refining also owns two of its former major competitors, C&H Sugar (California and Hawaii), purchased in 2005, and Jack Frost (National Sugar Company).

See also
History of sugar
American Sugar Refining
Utah-Idaho Sugar Company

References

Bibliography
 
 

Sugar companies of the United States
Food manufacturers of the United States
Former monopolies
Food and drink companies based in New Jersey

Food and drink companies established in 1891
1891 establishments in New Jersey